Billy Pang is a Canadian politician, who was elected to the Legislative Assembly of Ontario in the 2018 provincial election. He represents the riding of Markham—Unionville as a member of the Progressive Conservative Party of Ontario.

In 2014, Pang was elected as a Trustee for the York Region District School Board.

References

Progressive Conservative Party of Ontario MPPs
21st-century Canadian politicians
Living people
Ontario school board trustees
Canadian politicians of Chinese descent
Year of birth missing (living people)